Guy Le Jaouen (1933–2014) was a French politician.

Early life
Guy Le Jaouen was born on 30 August 1933 in Le Creusot.

Career
He joined the National Front, and served as a member of the National Assembly from 1986 to 1988, representing Loire. In 1988, however, he left the National Front and joined the Rally for the Republic party (RPR).

Death
He died on 3 December 2014.

References

1933 births
2014 deaths
People from Le Creusot
Politicians from Bourgogne-Franche-Comté
National Rally (France) politicians
Deputies of the 8th National Assembly of the French Fifth Republic